Castelnuovo Bocca d'Adda is a comune (municipality) in the Province of Lodi in the Italian region Lombardy, located about  southeast of Milan and about  southeast of Lodi.

Castelnuovo Bocca d'Adda borders the following municipalities: Crotta d'Adda, Maccastorna, Meleti, Monticelli d'Ongina, Caselle Landi, Caorso.

References

Cities and towns in Lombardy